Leirfjord Church is a parish church of the Church of Norway in Leirfjord Municipality in Nordland county, Norway. It is located in the village of Leland. It is the main church for the Leirfjord parish which is part of the Nord-Helgeland prosti (deanery) in the Diocese of Sør-Hålogaland. The wooden church was built in a cruciform style in 1867 using plans drawn up by the architect Niels Stockfleth Darre Eckhoff. The church seats about 450 people.

History
The first church in Leirfjord was constructed in 1867 and was consecrated on 27 August 1867. Over time, the movement of the ground due to the frost, contributed to some structural damage. There was also a leak along one of the chimneys. Restoration and repair work was scheduled to begin in 1937, but due to the German occupation in World War II, the work did not begin until 1950 after the war was over. At that time, the building received frost-proofing by extending the foundation deeper below the frost line. New chimneys were constructed outside the walls of the building. The floor was replaced and insulated from underneath in the newly dug out basement. The tower was also in poor condition so it was replaced.

See also
List of churches in Sør-Hålogaland

References

Leirfjord
Churches in Nordland
Wooden churches in Norway
Cruciform churches in Norway
19th-century Church of Norway church buildings
Churches completed in 1867
1867 establishments in Norway